The Somaliland National Army, is the land force and largest branch of the Somaliland Armed Forces is based in the Somaliland capital of Hargeisa. There are approximately 100,000 active members and additional 4,000 in reserves. The Somaliland National Army is composed entirely of professionals and volunteers due to the army not being mandatory of conscription. Some Somaliland battalions operate near the Puntland border due to a border dispute.

History

The history of the Somaliland army dates back to the Protectorate era and was founded by the British Army as Somaliland Camel Corps in the 20th. In 1941 World War II Italy invaded British Somaliland. In December 1941 after the liberation of British Somaliland from Italy.  
Somaliland Scouts has dissolution of the Somaliland Camel Corps in 1942, which was formerly tasked with the defense of the protectorate.

The Somaliland National Army was established in 1993 and was established by the Somaliland reconciliation.

Vehicles, Equipment and Camouflage

 Main Battle Tank
 T-55A (1974-1976) (MBT) - 7 to 40 in service and 7+ in operational service
 T-54B (1974-1976) (MBT) - 3 to 40 in service and 3+ in operational service
 T-72B (date unknown) (MBT) - current numbers unknown
 Armoured Personnel Carriers
 Fiat 6614 (APC) - 5+ in both operational service and regular service
 Fiat 6616 (Turret - 20mm, APC) 1+ in both operational service and regular service
 Fiat 6616 (UB-16 Rockets, Turret - 20mm) - 3+ in both operational service and regular service
 Transport Vehicles
 Iveco LMV (4x4)
 Renault GBC-180 (6×6)
 M939 Truck (6×6)
 Toyota Landcruiser J79
 Toyota Hilux
 Nissan Frontier
 Ford F350 (Armoured Gun Truck)
 Humvee 
 Self-Propelled Artillery
  BM-21 Grad (Multiple Rocket Launcher - 122mm) - estimated 100-200 in both regular service and operational service
 Humvee (Multiple Rocket Launcher)
  D-44 (Artillery - 85mm) - estimated 27+ in both regular service and operational service
 Mortar
  M-224 (Mortar - 60mm)
  M1938 (Mortar - 120mm)
 Anti-Aircraft Gun
  ZU-23-2 (Twin-barreled anti-aircraft gun - 23mm)
 Camo
  U.S. Woodland (Primary Camo)
  Multi-Terrain Pattern

Battalions and Regiments
 Army Command (Hargeisa)
   JSL Specialised Infantry Battalion
   JSL Tank Regiment
   JSL Commandos Regiment
   JSL Army Band

Ranks

Gallery

Combat History

Somaliland War of Independence

The Somaliland War of Independence (Somali: Dagaalkii Xoraynta Soomaaliland, lit. 'Somaliland Liberation War') was a rebellion waged by the Somali National Movement against the ruling military junta in Somalia led by General Siad Barre lasting from its founding on 6 April 1981 and ended on 18 May 1991 when the SNM declared what was then northern Somalia independent as the Republic of Somaliland. The conflict served as the main theatre of the larger Somali Rebellion that started in 1978. The conflict was in response to the harsh policies enacted by the Barre regime against the main clan family in Somaliland, the Isaaq, including a declaration of economic warfare on the Isaaq. These harsh policies were put into effect shortly after the conclusion of the disastrous Ogaden war in 1978.

During the ongoing conflict between the forces of the Somali National Movement and the Somali Army, the Somali government's genocidal campaign against the Isaaq took place between May 1988 and March 1989, with explicit aims of handling the "Isaaq problem", Barre ordered the shelling and aerial bombardment of the major cities in the northwest and the systematic destruction of Isaaq dwellings, settlements and water points.[31] The Siad Barre regime targeted civilian members of the Isaaq group specifically, especially in the cities of Hargeisa and Burao and to that end employed the use of indiscriminate artillery shelling and aerial bombardment against civilian populations belonging to the Isaaq clan.

Puntland–Somaliland dispute
The Puntland–Somaliland dispute is a territorial dispute over the provinces of Sool, Sanaag and the Buuhoodle district of Togdheer region between the self-declared Republic of Somaliland and the Puntland state of Somalia. The territory was historically part of British Somaliland, a British protectorate that granted independence in 1960 and then formed a union with neighboring Italian colony Trust Territory of Somaliland to form the Somali Republic. When the Somaliland War of Independence was concluded and the Somali Civil War broke out, Somaliland declared independence from Somalia in 1991 as a successor state to the British protectorate and declared independence from Somalia.

The dispute started in 1998, when Puntland was formed as an autonomous state of Somalia and declared the region as part of its territory based on tribal affiliation of the locals.

Battle of Las Anod
The Battle of Las Anod saw Somaliland forces engage Puntland forces in Las Anod, capital of the Sool region. The ensuing battle resulted in Somaliland ousting the Puntland army from the city. Las Anod had until then been controlled by Puntland, who took control of the regional capital in 2002.

Somaliland had however been aiding local clan militias opposed to Puntland presence in the city. The clan militias were loyal to Ahmed Abdi Habsade, a former Puntland minister who later on defected to Somaliland. In October 2007, the conflict mushroomed into a regional conflict over control of the city of Las Anod, as Somaliland regular army forces mobilized from their base in the town of Adhicadeeye, west of the city, and entered the conflict. Puntland was slow to mobilize a counter-attack, as Puntland's weak economy and overstretched military obligations in Mogadishu prevented a rapid response. After assuming control of the city on October 15th, Somaliland moved Sool's regional administration into Las Anod. Between 10 and 20 people were reported to be dead.

2010 Ayn clashes
The 2010 Ayn clashes saw Somaliland forces engage Dulbahante clan militia in the Buuhoodle district. The battle was prompted by Ethiopian troops seizing a truck belonging to locals in Buuhoodle, sparking a response from residents and Ethiopian retaliatory attack on Buuhoodle and a Somaliland attack upon Widhwidh. More clashes were reported to have occurred near Widhwidh on 19 July 2010.

Battle of Tukaraq (2018) 
In 2018, the Battle of Tukaraq saw Somaliland forces engage Puntland forces in Tukaraq, a town in the eastern Sool region, on the road between the regional capitals of Las Anod and Garowe. The ensuing heavy clashes resulted in Somaliland ousting the Puntland army from the town. The battle was significant as it was the first time both forces clashed directly.

See also

Somaliland Armed Forces
Somaliland Coast Guard
Somaliland Police Force

References
Citations

External links

Army
Government of Somaliland
1991 establishments in Somaliland
Military units and formations established in 1991